Maksim Olegovich Chevelev (born 26 March 1990) is a Russian football defender. He plays for FC Novokuznetsk.

Club career
He played in the Russian Football National League for FC Metallurg-Kuzbass Novokuznetsk in 2012.

External links
 
 Career summary by sportbox.ru
 

1990 births
People from Novokuznetsk
Living people
Russian footballers
Association football defenders
FC Irtysh Omsk players
FC Novokuznetsk players
Sportspeople from Kemerovo Oblast